"Super Love", also titled "I Got Love (Super-Duper Love)", is a song written by J.P. Pennington and Sonny LeMaire, and recorded by American country music group Exile.  It was released in April 1986 as the third single from the album Hang On to Your Heart.  The song reached number 14 on the Billboard Hot Country Singles & Tracks chart.

Chart performance

References

1986 singles
1985 songs
Exile (American band) songs
Songs written by J.P. Pennington
Song recordings produced by Buddy Killen
Epic Records singles
Songs written by Sonny LeMaire